Rhos Gellie is a Site of Special Scientific Interest (SSSI) in Ceredigion, west Wales. It has been designated since 1988 as an SSSI as it is a habitat for marsh fritillary butterflies and also has a unique combination of varied vegetation types.

Geography 
Rhos Gellie is a marshy grassland.

References

See also
List of Sites of Special Scientific Interest in Ceredigion

Sites of Special Scientific Interest in Ceredigion